Uppal Jagir and Uppal khalsa are villages in the tehsil of Phillaur, near Nurmahal, Jalandhar district, in Punjab, India.

Demographics
According to the 2011 Census, Uppal Jagir and Uppal Khalsa have a population of 6,421 people. Neighbouring villages include Bohara, Dalla, Bhandal Sahib Rai and Kandola Kala Jalandhar.

History
According to local tradition, Uppal Jagir and Uppal Khalsa were settled over 250 years ago. Both villages are called "Jorhey" (twin)Uppalla as many residents share the Uppal surname.

References

Jalandhar
Villages in Jalandhar district